Convent of Our Lady of Mount Carmel or Convent of Nossa Senhora do Carmo may refer to:

Igreja e Convento de Nossa Senhora do Carmo, Luanda, Angola
Basilica and Convent of Nossa Senhora do Carmo, Recife, Brazil
Church and Convent of Our Lady of Mount Carmel, Salvador, Bahia, Brazil
Church and Convent of Our Lady of Mount Carmel (Cachoeira), Cachoeira, Bahia, Brazil
Carmo Convent, Lisbon, Portugal
Convent of Our Lady of Mount Carmel (Lagoa), Lagoa, Algarve, Portugal
Convent of Nossa Senhora do Carmo (Horta), Azores, Portugal

See also
Our Lady of Mount Carmel (disambiguation)